The Autostrada A56, more commonly known as the Tangenziale di Napoli (Naples Bypass or simply the Tange), is a controlled access toll road bypassing the urban center and suburban developments of Naples, Italy — connecting the SS7 near Arco Felice/Pozzuoli at the west to the A1 Autostrade at the east, with a total length of 20.2 km.  The most eastward section, from Junction 3 at Doganella to the A1, is toll-free.

History and features 
Designed in the 1960s, the contract to build the road was executed on 31 January 1968, and the first section opened on 21 July 1972 — beginning near Arco Felice to the west and moving east — with the section to Vomero opening on 24 January 1973; the section to Arenella opening on 1 February 1975, and the section to Capodichino opening on 16 November 1975.

Subsequent exit interchanges opened at Corso Malta (Junction 4) on 30 March 1976, at Capodimonte (Junction 5) on 22 January 1977 and at Zona Ospedaliera (Junction 7) on 26 May 1992, the latter facilitating access to the Cotugno, Monaldi and Pascale Hospitals.

The Tangenziale skirts closely to Naples hillsides; passes through a series of tunnels totaling 3.6 km in length; and passes over several older neighborhoods with a series of flyovers totalling 3.3 km in length. As one of the most congested motorways in Italy, over 270,000 vehicles use the Tangenziale daily, with traffic levels rivaling those of the A4 through Milan and the A8 near the Milan barrier toll plaza.

On 9 February 2009 an automated speed enforcement system began operating around the clock, using a system of 30 over-highway gantry-mounted cameras and 34 ceiling-mounted cameras in the tunnels. After a vehicle passes a camera, the system times the interval between the camera and a correlating set of road-embedded coils, to calculate the vehicle speed.  Marketed as the Safety Tutor system (or simply Tutor), the infrastructure monitors speeds at five eastbound locations (at the Solfatara tunnel entrance, Agnano, Fuorigrotta, Arenella and Capodichino) — as well as four westbound locations (at Camaldoli, Vomero, Fuorigrotta and Agnano). A map of the camera locations is available from Tangenziale di Napoli website: Chilometria_Tutor_Tangenziale_di_Napoli.pdf.

Along the entire ring road there are sound-absorbing barriers as well as centrally managed information displays. Maximum speed limited to 80 km/h. Tangenziale di Napoli SpA manages the road, with approximately 350 employees, including toll collectors and administrators.  Four vehicular service areas are located on the westbound lanes, and three additional areas serve eastbound traffic.

Junctions

References 
TangenzialidiNapoli.it. Retrieved on 8 April 2009
History of Tangenziale di Napoli. Retrieved on 8 April 2009

See also
Autostrada
List of motorways in Italy
Transport in Italy

A56
Transport in Naples
Ring roads in Italy
Phlegraean Fields